Wang Nam Yen is a district (amphoe) in the southern part of Sa Kaeo province, eastern Thailand.

History
In 1971 the government built a new road connecting Chanthaburi province with Sa Kaeo province. Then the people from Ban Tha Ta Si and Ban Nong Prue moved to establish a new village along the new road in the area. They named the new village Ban Wang Nam Yen after their important water resource. It was upgraded to Tambon Wang Nam Yen of Sa Kaeo district in 1975. 1 In December 1976 the minor district (king amphoe) Wang Nam Yen was created, consisting of the three tambons Wang Nam Yen, Wang Sombun, and Ta Lang Nai. Wang Nam Yen was upgraded to a full district on 1 April 1983.

Geography
Neighboring districts are (from the north clockwise) Khao Chakan, Watthana Nakhon, Khlong Hat, and Wang Sombun of Sa Kaeo province and Tha Takiap of Chachoengsao province.

Administration
The district is divided into four sub-districts (tambons), which are further subdivided into 84 villages (mubans). Wang Nam Yen is a township (thesaban tambon) which covers tambon Wang Nam Yen. There are a further three tambon administrative organizations (TAO).

Missing numbers are tambon which now form Wang Sombun District.

References

External links
amphoe.com

Wang Nam Yen